Hemaris saldaitisi is a moth of the family Sphingidae. It is known from Tuva in Russia.

It is similar to Hemaris tityus, but the marginal forewing band is very narrow and that of the hindwing is almost absent. Kitching & Cadiou considered that the diagnostic features of the holotype of Hemaris saldaitisi fell within the range of variation of Hemaris tityus and treated the former as a junior synonym of the latter. Eitschberger et al. reinstated Hemaris saldaitisi as a species, but gave no reason for doing so and did not attempt to refute the arguments of Kitching & Cadiou.

References

S
Moths of Asia
Insects of Russia
Moths described in 1998